D.I.S. Esporte e Organização de Eventos LTDA. is a private football investment fund. It was set up by Rio Grande do Sul native Delcir Sonda and Idi Sonda. They operate one of the São Paulo state supermarket chains, Sonda.

DIS was the strategic partner of Santos FC until the club had a new president. The club sued the fund in order to void the sales of players from Santos to the fund; old Santos president Marcelo Teixeira was accused to sell the young players for un-economic price, but the court rejected the claim. The company paid R$3,203,000 for 25% economic rights of the youth players in 2008

Investments 
The following investment were known:
 Anderson Planta
 André (André Felipe Ribeiro de Souza) (?–2010) 
 André Santos (2008–2009)
 Bananinha
 Breitner
 Breno (?–2007)
 Andrés D'Alessandro 
 Danilo (Danilo Luiz da Silva) (2010–2011)
 Dentinho
 Diego Faria
 Gabriel Silva
 Ganso
 Juan (Juan Guilherme Nunes Jesus)
 Kléber (Kléber de Carvalho Corrêa)
 Neymar 
 Nilmar (2007–2009)
 Renato (Renato de Araújo Chaves Júnior)
 Rafael Sóbis
 Thiago Neves (?–2008)
 Tiago Luís
 Tinga (Luiz Otávio Santos de Araújo)
 Vinícius ((Vinícius Santos Silva)
 Wesley (Wesley Lopes Beltrame) (?–2010)

References

See also
 Third-party ownership in association football

Association football organizations
Financial services companies of Brazil